The Committee for a Better New Orleans is a privately funded community organization and advocacy group in New Orleans, Louisiana, in the United States. It was started in 2000 by Joe Canizaro, a wealthy property developer, and included college presidents and local religious leaders. The group prepared and published a "Blueprint for a Better New Orleans", a plan for improvements to management and infrastructure of the city. The organization has 501(c)(3) non-profit status.

References

Community organizations
Advocacy groups in the United States
Organizations based in New Orleans